Richard E. Wilborn (born February 10, 1945) is a Republican member of the Kansas Senate, representing the 35th district. He has served since the beginning of January 2015.

Early life 
Wilborn graduated from Kansas State University, and has resided in McPherson, Kansas, for over 45 years.

Political positions 
Wilborn opposes abortion, gun control, Obamacare and left-leaning policies.

In 2015, Wilborn sponsored Senate Bill 45 which authorized the carrying of concealed handguns without a license. He also sponsored Senate Bill 95, which ultimately created the Kansas Unborn Child Protection from Dismemberment Abortion Act.

Committee membership

Wilborn currently serves on the following legislative committees:
Commerce
Federal and State Affairs
Financial Institutions
Telecommunications Study Committee
Utilities

References

1945 births
21st-century American politicians
Republican Party Kansas state senators
Kansas State University alumni
Living people
People from McPherson, Kansas